The fluorenylmethoxycarbonyl protecting group (Fmoc) is a base-labile protecting group used in organic synthesis.

Protection & Formation
Fmoc carbamate is frequently used as a protecting group for amines, where the Fmoc group can be introduced by reacting the amine with fluorenylmethyloxycarbonyl chloride (Fmoc-Cl), e.g.:

The other common method for introducing the Fmoc group is through 9-fluorenylmethylsuccinimidyl carbonate (Fmoc-OSu), which may itself be obtained by the reaction of Fmoc-Cl with the dicyclohexylammonium salt of N-hydroxysuccinimide.

Reacting with 9-fluorenylmethyloxycarbonyl azide (itself made by reacting Fmoc-Cl with sodium azide) in sodium bicarbonate and aqueous dioxane is also a method to install Fmoc group.

Because the fluorenyl group is highly fluorescent, certain UV-inactive compounds may be reacted to give the Fmoc derivatives, suitable for analysis by reversed phase HPLC. Analytical uses of Fmoc-Cl that do not use chromatography may be limited by the requirement that excess Fmoc-Cl be removed before an analysis of fluorescence.

Cleavage & Deprotection

The Fmoc group is rapidly removed by primary bases as well as some secondary bases. Piperidine is usually preferred for Fmoc group removal as it forms a stable adduct with the dibenzofulvene byproduct, preventing it from reacting with the substrate. Fmoc protection has found significant use in solid phase peptide synthesis (SPPS).

Roles in SPPS
The use of Fmoc as a temporary protecting group for amine at the N-terminus in SPPS is very widespread for Fmoc/tBu approach, because its removal with piperidine solution does not disturb the acid-labile linker between the peptide and the resin. A typical SPPS Fmoc deprotection is performed with a solution of 20% piperidine in N,N-dimethylformamide (DMF).

Common deprotection cocktails for Fmoc during SPPS:
 20% piperidine in DMF (Fmoc group has an approximate half life of 6 seconds in this solution)
 5% piperazine, 1% DBU and 1% formic acid in DMF. This method avoids the use of strictly controlled piperidine. No side product was observed for a peptide with 9 residues synthesized with this method.

References

Biochemistry methods
Protecting groups